Doctor Who, also referred to as Doctor Who: The Television Movie or simply Doctor Who: The Movie to distinguish it from the television series of the same title, is a 1996 television film continuing the British science fiction television series Doctor Who. It was developed as a co-production between Universal Studios and BBC Worldwide. It premiered on 12 May 1996 on CITV in Edmonton, Alberta, Canada, 15 days before its first showing in the United Kingdom on BBC One and two days before being broadcast in the United States on Fox. It was also shown in some countries for a limited time in cinemas.

The film was the first attempt to revive Doctor Who following its suspension in 1989. It was intended as a backdoor pilot for a new American-produced Doctor Who TV series. It introduced Paul McGann as the Eighth Doctor in his only televised appearance as the character until "The Night of the Doctor" in 2013 (though McGann has portrayed the Doctor also in various audio productions). It also marks the final appearance of Sylvester McCoy as the Seventh Doctor until his cameo appearance in "The Power of the Doctor" in 2022, the only appearance of Daphne Ashbrook as companion Grace Holloway, and the only onscreen appearance of Eric Roberts's version of The Master, although he has since reprised the role in audio dramas for Big Finish Productions. Although a ratings success in the United Kingdom, the film did not fare well on American television and no series was commissioned. The series was later relaunched on the BBC in 2005. The only Doctor Who episodes between the film and the new series were a 1999 spoof, Doctor Who and the Curse of Fatal Death, and a 2003 animation, Scream of the Shalka.

Although the film was primarily produced by different people than the 1963–1989 series and intended for an American audience, the producers chose not to produce a "re-imagining" or "reboot" of the series but rather a continuation of the original narrative. The production was filmed in Vancouver, British Columbia and was the only episode of Doctor Who filmed in Canada.

Plot
The Doctor, currently in his seventh incarnation, transports the Master's remains to Gallifrey via his TARDIS. The Master had been previously trialed and executed at the hands of the Daleks. En route, the box with his remains breaks open and an ooze leaks out, infecting the TARDIS. The Doctor is forced to make an emergency materialisation in San Francisco's Chinatown on 30 December 1999.

After exiting the TARDIS, the Doctor is shot by a gang chasing down Chang Lee, a young Chinese-American man. Lee calls for an ambulance and escorts the unconscious Doctor to a hospital. The ooze from the TARDIS also gets aboard the ambulance. At the hospital, after the bullets are removed, cardiologist Dr. Grace Holloway attempts surgery to stabilise his unusual heartbeat, but is confused by his strange double-heart anatomy. After the Doctor apparently dies in the operating table, his body is taken to the morgue, and Lee steals his possessions. The ooze takes over the body of the ambulance driver, Bruce.

Later, the Doctor regenerates. The new Doctor, suffering amnesia, recognises Holloway, who has resigned from the hospital after the failed operation. He follows her to her car and proves he is the same man she failed to save. Grace takes him home to recover. Now in Bruce's body, the Master puts Lee under his mind control. He convinces Lee that the Doctor had stolen his original body. He also persuades him into opening the TARDIS' Eye of Harmony, which requires a human retinal scan. When the Eye opens, the Doctor is flooded with memories and realises the Master is searching for him. He warns Grace that while the Eye is opened, the fabric of reality will weaken. Earth will be potentially destroyed by midnight on New Year's Eve if they cannot close it. To solve this conundrum, he needs an atomic clock, and there is one on display at the San Francisco Institute of Technological Advancement and Research.

Outside, the Doctor and Grace find the ambulance. Stepping from it, the Master and Lee offer them a ride. The Doctor does not immediately recognise the Master, but discovers his true identity en route, and escapes with Grace. The two continue to the Institute, obtain the clock and return to the TARDIS. The Doctor then installs the clock and closes the Eye. However, the damage is so great that he must revert time before the Eye was opened to prevent Earth's destruction. As he connects the proper TARDIS circuits to do this, the Master takes control of Grace's body, and she strikes the Doctor unconscious.

The Doctor wakes to find himself chained above the Eye, the Master poised to take his remaining regenerations while Lee and Grace watch. The Doctor is able to break the Master's control on Lee, who refuses to open the Eye again. The Master kills him, forces Grace to open the Eye and begins drawing the Doctor's lifeforce. After being again under her own control, Grace completes the final circuits to put the TARDIS into a time-holding pattern, preventing the apocalypse. She then goes to free the Doctor. The Master kills her, but this has given enough time for the Doctor to free himself. In the ensuing fight, The Doctor gains the upper hand and pushes the Master into the Eye. The Eye closes and time reverts a few minutes, undoing Lee and Grace's deaths.

With no further risk to Earth, the Doctor prepares to leave. Lee returns his possessions, and the Doctor warns him not to be in San Francisco on the next New Year's Eve. The Doctor offers Grace the opportunity to travel with him, but she politely refuses, and kisses him goodbye. The Doctor departs alone in his TARDIS.

Production

Pre-production
Producer Philip Segal had been trying for some years to launch a new American-produced series of Doctor Who, but the Fox Network — the only American network that showed any interest — was only prepared to commit to a single telemovie. It was hoped that, should the telemovie be successful, Fox might be persuaded to reconsider a series; however, the telemovie's ratings performance in America was not strong enough to hold Fox's interest.

The production budget for the movie (as revealed in the book Doctor Who: Regeneration) was US$5 million, with the Fox Network spending $2.5 million, BBC Television contributing $300,000, and the remaining $2.2 million split between BBC Worldwide and Universal Television.

Casting
Casting sessions took place in March 1994; actors who actually auditioned for the role include Liam Cunningham, Mark McGann, Robert Lindsay, Tim McInnerny, Nathaniel Parker, Peter Woodward, John Sessions, Anthony Head, and Tony Slattery. Paul McGann was first considered around the time of these auditions, but did not formally audition for the part until later.

Among the actors who were invited to audition for the role of the Doctor but declined the opportunity were Christopher Eccleston and Peter Capaldi. Eccleston and Capaldi later played the Ninth and Twelfth incarnations of the Doctor, respectively, in the revived series of Doctor Who which began in 2005. Eccleston turned down the offer to audition for the TV Movie because, at the time, he felt he did not want to be associated with a "brand name" so early in his career. Capaldi declined because he felt it was unlikely that he would be given the part.

Of those actors who originally auditioned for the role of the Doctor, a number guest-starred in the series when it returned from 2005:
Anthony Head guest-starred in the Series 2 episode "School Reunion" as Mr. Finch.
Tim McInnerny guest-starred in the Series 4 episode "Planet of the Ood" as Klineman Halpen.
Liam Cunningham guest-starred in the Series 7 episode "Cold War" as Captain Zhukov. 
John Sessions guest-starred in the Series 8 episode "Mummy on the Orient Express" as the voice of the homicidal computer GUS.

Production
The movie was filmed on 35mm film in Vancouver, British Columbia, the first time any Doctor Who story had been filmed in North America.

In the 2005 Doctor Who Confidential episode "Weird Science", and on the DVD commentary, Sylvester McCoy reveals that during the sequence where he locks the casket with his sonic screwdriver, he held the tool pointing the wrong way around (although in the original series, it is seen being used both ways). The sonic screwdriver was blurred in post-production to conceal the error.

Post-production
The opening pre-credits sequence went through a number of modifications, with several different voice-overs recorded. At one stage the voice-over was to be made by the old Master, played by Gordon Tipple; in the end this was not used. Tipple is still credited as "The Old Master", though in the final edit his appearance is very brief, stationary, and mute. Had the original pre-titles voice-over been used, it would have been unclear what incarnation of the Doctor Sylvester McCoy portrays in the movie (as he is simply credited as "The Old Doctor"). Only the rewritten narration (as read by Paul McGann) makes his number of regenerations clear. The sequence of the TARDIS flying through the time vortex was briefly reused in the opening of Doctor Who and the Curse of Fatal Death, as the Master observes Rowan Atkinson's Doctor.

Instead of designing a new Doctor Who logo for this film, it was decided instead to use a modified version of the logo that was used for the Jon Pertwee era of the original series (with the exception of the final season). This logo, being the last logo used on an "official" Doctor Who broadcast before the 2005 revival, was, until 2018, used by the BBC for most Doctor Who merchandise relating to the first eight Doctors. In 2018, efforts were made to make the show's merchandise more uniform, and so most items of merchandise began to use the logo designed for Jodie Whittaker's time as the Doctor, abandoning the "Movie" logo for the first time in 22 years.

John Debney was commissioned to write the score for this film, and intended to replace Ron Grainer's original theme with a new composition. Ultimately Debney did in fact use an arrangement of Grainer's music for the theme, although Grainer goes uncredited.

Alternative titles and labelling 
Both DVD releases are labelled Doctor Who: The Movie. The VHS release contains both the name Doctor Who and the phrase The Sensational Feature Length Film (plausibly read as a subtitle). The novelisation was labelled simply The Novel of the Film. The 2021 Target Collection reissue of the novelisation is titled The TV Movie. The most common fan usage appears to refer to it as "The Television Movie" or "TVM", or variations thereof.

Upon translation into French, this film was renamed Le Seigneur du Temps (literal translation: "The Lord of Time").

"TVM" is the production code used in the BBC's online episode guide. The actual code used during production is 50/LDX071Y/01X. Doctor Who Magazines "Complete Eighth Doctor Special" gives the production code as #83705. Big Finish Productions uses the code 8A, and numbers its subsequent Eighth Doctor stories correspondingly.

Broadcast and reception
The movie debuted on the Edmonton, Alberta CITV-TV station on 12 May 1996, two days prior to its Fox Network broadcast.

Commercials on the Fox network advertising the film used special effects footage from the 1986 story The Trial of a Time Lord, although this footage was not used in the movie. This marked the first time that footage from the original BBC series had been shown on a major American network. The advertisements also used a different arrangement of the Doctor Who theme music from that heard in the film.

The movie received disappointing US ratings. It received 5.6 million viewers, a total 9% share of the audience. However, when shown on BBC One in the United Kingdom on Monday 27 May at 8.30pm, thirteen days after its American broadcast, it received over 9 million viewers in the UK alone. It received a 75% Audience Appreciation score.

Third Doctor actor Jon Pertwee died a few days after the US broadcast of the film, and the UK broadcast included an epitaph to the actor. The UK broadcast was also edited for broadcast in a pre-Watershed timeslot, with around 1 minute of cuts made. The scenes where Chang Lee's friends are fired upon was cut because of the BBC's sensitivity about gun violence following the Dunblane massacre three months before. The operating room scene was also extensively cut, in particular shots involving the cardiac probe and the Seventh Doctor's dying scream, and the shot of the Master breaking Chang Lee's neck was also removed.

Maureen Paton in the Daily Express praised the movie "At last we have a grown-up hi-tech Doctor Who in Paul McGann...only a low-tech Luddite would miss the endearing amateurism of the old teatime serial format...the makers would be mad not to pursue the option of a series." Matthew Bond of The Times, by contrast stated "If the series is to return it will need stronger scripts than this simplistic offering, which struggled to fill eighty-five minutes and laboured somewhat in its search for wit". The letters pages of the Radio Times were divided between viewers who liked and disliked the TVM. Discussing the TVM, writer Gary Gillatt criticised it for having "too many unnecessary references" to the show's backstory. Gillatt added "although very entertaining, stylishly directed and perfectly played, the TV movie perhaps tried a little too hard to be what Doctor Who once was, rather than crusading to demonstrate what it could be in the future".

Awards
Doctor Who: The Television Movie won the 1996 Saturn Award for Best Television Presentation.

Commercial releases

Home media

A Laserdisc release of the movie was released exclusively in Hong Kong by Universal in 1997.

The unedited version was released on DVD in the UK in 2001 titled as Doctor Who: The Movie, and was re-released in 2007 as a limited edition with an alternative cover sleeve (but with no change in content) as part of a series of classic series re-releases aimed at attracting fans of the revived series to the older shows.

Both the edited and unedited versions have also been released in countries such as Australia and New Zealand.

The 2010 DVD box set Revisitations contains the movie with new, updated Special Edition DVD features. It included a new commentary with Paul McGann and Sylvester McCoy, an hour-long documentary on the time in between the film and the series' cancellation in 1989, a documentary on the 7 years it took to get the film made, a documentary on the 8th Doctor's comic strip adventures, a documentary on the media reaction to the 8th Doctor, a documentary on the ties between Blue Peter and Doctor Who as well as all of the original features, including the original commentary with Geoffrey Sax.

Due to complex licensing issues, no VHS release of the film occurred in North America, and for more than a decade no DVD release occurred, either. Finally, on 25 August 2010, Dan Hall of 2entertain confirmed that the 2010 updated version would be released in North America sometime in the next twelve months following extensive negotiations with Universal Studios. Two months afterward, a North American DVD release date for the 2-disc Doctor Who: The Movie – Special Edition was announced to be 8 February 2011.

In 2013 it was released on DVD again as part of the "Doctor Who: The Doctors Revisited 5–8" box set, alongside the classic serials Earthshock, Vengeance on Varos, and Remembrance of the Daleks. Alongside a documentary on the Eighth Doctor, it also features an introduction from current show runner Steven Moffat. This was also released in North America.

The movie was released as a 2-disc Blu-ray set in Region 2 on 19 September 2016. The footage was not re-scanned from the original film negatives. Instead it is a 1080/50i upscale which suffered from the same PAL speedup issue as previous home media releases.

VHS releases

Laserdisc releases

DVD and Blu-ray releases

Soundtrack release

Music from the movie was on a promotional-only soundtrack album published by the composer, John Debney. Additional music was contributed by John Sponsler and Louis Febre. Although the composer of the Doctor Who Theme, Ron Grainer, did not receive screen credit for his composition in the TV movie broadcast, the CD finally attributes the proper credit on its cover. The entire score was re-released with previously unreleased cues as the eighth disc of the eleven disc Doctor Who: The 50th Anniversary Collection on 29 September 2014.

Track listing

CD credits
 Music Score produced by John Debney
 Executive album producers: John J. Alcantar III and Thomas C. Stewart
 Music Editor: Laurie Slomka
 CD Edited and mastered by James Nelson at Digital Outland
 CD Art direction: Mark Banning
 Front Cover concept: David Hirsch
 Special Thanks to Ryan K. Johnson

In print

The television movie was novelised by Gary Russell and published by BBC Books 15 May 1996. It was the first novelisation of a televised Doctor Who story to not be published by Target Books (or related companies) since Doctor Who and the Crusaders in 1966.

Basing the adaptation on an early draft of the script, Russell adjusted some details to make it more consistent with the original series, and the novelisation also contains elements that were cut from the shooting script for timing reasons.
 The novel begins with the Seventh Doctor receiving a telepathic summons from the Master (similar to The Deadly Assassin) to collect his remains from Skaro and a short prologue detailing how the Doctor escapes from the planet with the casket. This was originally intended to be a pre-credits sequence in the movie, and was subsequently contradicted by the ending of the novel Lungbarrow, where Romana gives the Seventh Doctor the assignment to retrieve the Master's remains.
 More detail is given to Chang Lee and Grace's backstory, including his recruitment into the Triads and his seeking a father figure as well as flashbacks to Grace's childhood.
 The Eighth Doctor finds the Seventh Doctor's clothing in the hospital rather than the Fourth Doctor's scarf. Also, the sequence where Chang Lee and the Master see the Seventh Doctor in the Eye of Harmony features all the previous Doctors as originally drafted.
 The scene where the Doctor and Grace meet the motorcycle police officer is relocated to a traffic jam on the Golden Gate Bridge (impossible to film in the movie since it was shot on location in Vancouver).
 When the Doctor first kisses Grace, he immediately pulls back, grins apologetically and murmurs, "I'm sorry, don't know what came over me there." This makes the romantic nature of the kiss more ambiguous. Instead of the second kiss at the end, he gives her the Seventh Doctor's straw hat as a memento.
 The Doctor is still referred to as half-human, to which the Master comments, "The Doctor once claimed to be more than just a Time Lord — He should really have said less than a Time Lord!" This was a reference to a line cut from Remembrance of the Daleks.
 Instead of dying and being brought back to life, Grace and Lee are merely rendered unconscious, though aware of what is happening around them. Russell also spends some time showing the Doctor and them discussing what a "temporal orbit" is.

The novelisation was the first Doctor Who novel published by BBC Books. The book was actually published prior to the conclusion of Virgin Books' contract for publishing original Doctor Who fiction, so the next release by BBC Books did not occur for about a year when the Eighth Doctor Adventures series began with The Eight Doctors. The novelisation was released as a standalone work and is not considered part of this series. The Eighth Doctor Adventures series ran until 2005 when it was discontinued.

The novel was also released as an audio book on 2 June 1997, read by Paul McGann. This reading was later included on the 2004 MP3 CD Tales from the TARDIS Volume Two. A revised Target Books edition titled The TV Movie was published in paperback and as an audiobook 11 March 2021.

Continuations 
 Paul McGann made a reappearance as the Eighth Doctor in the 2013 mini-episode "The Night of the Doctor" in which his regeneration was finally explored.
Eric Roberts reprised the role of the Master in many Big Finish audio plays: Series 5 of "The Diary of River Song", Volume 4 of "Doctor Who: Ravenous", and reprised the role again in "Masterful", a special release celebrating 50 Years since the Master first appeared in "Terror of the Autons" back in 1971. Roberts reprised the role of his incarnation of the Master in Master! two months after the release of Masterful. The box set also starred Chase Masterson as Vienna Salvatorri. Roberts even recorded live-action material of himself playing the Master for the Big Finish YouTube channel.
 Yee Jee Tso returned in 2002 to play Major Jal Brant in the Seventh Doctor audio drama Excelis Decays and Doctor Reece Goddard in the Sixth Doctor webcast Real Time.
Daphne Ashbrook returned in 2004, alongside Paul McGann, as Perfection in the audio drama The Next Life.
 Tso and Ashbrook returned to Big Finish together playing Captain Ruth Matheson and Warrant Officer Charlie Sato of UNIT in the audio dramas Tales From The Vaultand Mastermind, both part of the Companions Chronicles series, in 2011 and 2013.

References

Works cited

External links

Reviews
 The Whoniverse's review on Doctor Who: The Enemy Within DVD

BBC novelisation

1996 science fiction films
1996 films
Films based on Doctor Who
Seventh Doctor stories
Eighth Doctor stories
1996 television films
American science fiction television films
British science fiction television films
Television films as pilots
Television pilots not picked up as a series
Films set in 1999
Films set in 2000
Films set in San Francisco
Films set in the future
The Master (Doctor Who) television stories
Films based on television series
Films with screenplays by Matthew Jacobs
Films directed by Geoffrey Sax
Doctor Who stories set on Earth
Films about amnesia
Films set around New Year
Films scored by John Debney
Films scored by Louis Febre
Television films based on television series
Fiction featuring the turn of the third millennium
1990s English-language films
1990s American films
1990s British films
Doctor Who regeneration stories